Lieutenant-General Arthur Moyses William Hill, 2nd Baron Sandys (10 January 1792 – 16 July 1860), styled as Lord Arthur Hill until 1836, was an Anglo-Irish soldier and politician.

Background
Hill was the second son of Arthur Hill, 2nd Marquess of Downshire, and Mary, daughter and heiress of Colonel the Honourable Martin Sandys, son of Samuel Sandys, 1st Baron Sandys. His mother was created Baroness Sandys in her own right in 1802, with remainder to her younger sons.

Military service
He joined the army in 1809 as a Cornet in the 10th Hussars. He was promoted to lieutenant in 1810 and to captain in 1813. He served in the Peninsular War, including at the Battles of Vittoria and Pampeluna.

He served in the Battle of Waterloo as one of Wellington's aides de camp, with the rank of captain. He was supposedly the fattest young man in the British Army.

He remained in the army until 1858, ultimately rising to the rank of colonel of the 7th Dragoons.

Political career
Hill entered Parliament as one of two representatives for County Down in 1817, a seat he held until 1836, when he succeeded his mother in the barony.

Personal life
Hill died in July 1860, aged 68. He never married. He was succeeded in the barony by his younger brother, Lord Marcus.

Arms

References

External links

1793 births
1860 deaths
Hill, Arthur
Royal Scots Greys officers
Hill, Arthur
Hill, Arthur
Hill, Arthur
Hill, Arthur
Hill, Arthur
Hill, Arthur
Hill, Arthur
Hill, Arthur
UK MPs who inherited peerages
Younger sons of barons
Younger sons of marquesses
Arthur
Arthur 2